Skippack Creek is a  tributary of Perkiomen Creek in Montgomery County, Pennsylvania in the United States.

A portion of the creek flows through Evansburg State Park and passes by the census-designated place of Skippack.

Skippack is a Native American name purported to mean "a pool of stagnant water".

It is stocked with brown and rainbow trout; other fish in the creek include smallmouth bass, catfish, sucker, carp, panfish, and freshwater eel.

See also
List of rivers of Pennsylvania

References

Rivers of Pennsylvania
Tributaries of the Schuylkill River
Rivers of Montgomery County, Pennsylvania